Another mission bearing the name San Fernando Rey de España is located in the Mission Hills neighborhood of Los Angeles, California.

The mission was founded in 1769 by Franciscan missionary Junípero Serra and was the only mission founded by Franciscan missionaries in what is now Baja California.

History

The site for the future mission was identified by the Jesuit missionary-explorer Wenceslaus Linck in 1766. After the Jesuits were replaced by the Franciscans in 1768, the latter were charged with extending Spanish control far to the north, into Alta California. Mission San Fernando, at the Cochimí settlement of Velicatá on the route north, was established by Junípero Serra during the early stages of the Portolá expedition, on May 14, 1769, the day of Pentecost. This would be Father Junipero Serra's first mission before moving north to Alta California.

In the 1770s, under the Franciscans and then after 1773 under their Dominican successors, the mission quickly reached its peak and went into decline as epidemics decimated the native population. A missionary was no longer permanently resident at the site after about 1818.

Present day
A few ruined walls and stone foundations survive at the site as well as petroglyphs and some remains of pictograms. Just to the west of the mission ruins is possible find an aqueduct and a small dam.

See also
 Spanish missions in Baja California

References

 Sauer, Carl O., and Peveril Meigs. 1927. "Site and Culture at San Fernando Velicatá". University of California Publications in Geography 2:271–302. Berkeley.
 Vernon, Edward W. 2002. Las Misiones Antiguas: The Spanish Missions of Baja California, 1683–1855. Viejo Press, Santa Barbara, California.
 Meighan, Clement. Seven Rock Art Sites in Baja California Ballena Press, 1978.
 Aschmann, Homer. 1959. The Central Desert of Baja California: Demography and Ecology. Manessier Press, San Diego, California.
 Writings of Junípero Serra. Edited by Antonine ... v.1. Serra, Junípero, Saint, 1713-1784 (https://babel.hathitrust.org/cgi/pt?q1=velicata;id=uc1.b3929749;view=plaintext;start=1;sz=10;page=root;size=100;seq=117;num=61)

External links
 http://www.questconnect.org/baja_california_missions.htm
 https://web.archive.org/web/20060125005937/http://www.bajacalifologia.org/english/history.htm
 bajamissions The Spanish missions and visitas of Baja California.

San Fernando Rey de Espana
Landmarks in Ensenada
1769 establishments in New Spain
Junípero Serra